La Palma Club de Fútbol is a Spanish football team based in La Palma del Condado, Huelva, in the autonomous community of Andalusia. Founded in 1915, it currently plays in División de Honor – Group 1, holding home matches at Estadio Municipal La Palma del Condado, with a capacity of 2,000 spectators.

Season to season

21 seasons in Tercera División

References

External links
 
Soccerway team profile

1915 establishments in Spain
Association football clubs established in 1915
Football clubs in Andalusia